Estádio Antônio Lins Ribeiro Guimarães  is a multi-use stadium located in Santa Bárbara d'Oeste, Brazil. It is used mostly for football matches and hosts the home matches of União Agrícola Barbarense Futebol Clube. The stadium has a maximum capacity of 15,000 people and was built in 1921.

External links
Templos do Futebol

Antonio R. Guimaraes
Sports venues in São Paulo (state)